Daniel Robert Jenky, CSC (born March 3, 1947) is an American prelate of the Roman Catholic Church who served as bishop of the Diocese of Peoria in Illinois from 2002 until his retirement in 2022.  He also served as an auxiliary bishop of the Diocese of Fort Wayne-South Bend in Indiana from 1997 to 2002.

Biography

Early life and education
Daniel Jenky was born on March 3, 1947, in Chicago, Illinois, and attended St. Laurence High School, under the direction of the Irish Christian Brothers. He entered the University of Notre Dame in 1965, and the novitiate of the Congregation of Holy Cross at Bennington, Vermont in 1966. In 1970, Jenky obtained a Bachelor of History degree from Notre Dame. In 1973, Jenky made his profession as member of the Congregation of Holy Cross, the same year in which he earned his Master of Theology degree and received his diaconate.

Ordination and ministry
Jenky was ordained to the priesthood for the Congregation of Holy Cross on April 6, 1974. He then taught social studies and religion at Bourgade Catholic High School in Phoenix, Arizona. In 1975, Jenky returned to Notre Dame and became the rector of Dillon Hall, the director of campus ministry, and the rector of Sacred Heart Church, teaching courses as well. In 1985, Jenky became superior of the Holy Cross priests and brothers at Notre Dame.

Auxiliary Bishop of Fort Wayne-South Bend
On October 21, 1997, Pope John Paul II appointed Jenky as an auxiliary bishop of the Diocese of Fort Wayne-South Bend and titular bishop of Amantia. On December 16, 1997, he received his episcopal consecration from Bishop John M. D'Arcy, with Archbishop Agostino Cacciavillan and Archbishop Charles Schleck serving as co-consecrators.  Jenky was assigned as rector of St. Matthew's Cathedral in South Bend, Indiana, and pastor of the parish.

Bishop of Peoria
On February 12, 2002, John Paul II appointed Jenky as bishop of the Diocese of Peoria. He was installed on April 10 at St. Mary's Cathedral in Peoria. 

On March 3, 2022 Jenky's retirement as bishop of Peoria was accepted by Pope Francis.

Political controversy 
In an April 2012 "Men's March" homily, Jenky denounced the US Patient Protection and Affordable Care Act, Obama, and members of the U.S. Senate, comparing them to early persecutors of Christians, barbarians, "wave after wave of Jihads", the "Age of Revolution", Nazis, and Communists.  Jenky continued: "… the Church will survive the entrenched corruption and sheer incompetence of our Illinois state government, and even the calculated disdain of the President of the United States, his bureaucrats and HHS, and the majority in today's Federal senate."Tom Dermody (April 15, 2012). "'Heroic Catholicism' needed in face of threats, bishop tells men", The Catholic Post.  Over 90 faculty members at Notre Dame protested Jenky's remarks in a letter to Notre Dame President John I. Jenkins and the chairman of Notre Dame's board of trustees. The signers asked Jenky to renounce his remarks or resign from the Notre Dame board of fellows. The letter described his remarks as insensitive and too political in tone.

Local chapters of the NAACP, the ACLU, and the Anti-Defamation League also demanded a Jenky apology.  Some called for the Internal Revenue Service to investigate Jenky because the diocese, as a tax-exempt, non-profit entity, is supposed to refrain from overtly political comments. Rabbi Daniel Bogard of Peoria's Anshai Emeth Congregation said that Jenky was engaging in demagoguery and using the Holocaust "as a partisan political ploy that trivializes the memory of 13 million innocents killed." In response, vicar general James E. Kruse and Notre Dame Chancellor Patricia Gibson said that Jenky was making an analogy to point out that the U.S. was starting to suffer an erosion of religious freedom and of the freedom of expression, particularly for Christians.

Sex abuse 
In February 2018, Jenky was sued along with the other Catholic bishops in Illinois.  Two of the plaintiffs claimed sexual abuse by priests in the Diocese of Peoria during the 1970's and 1980's.  Attorney Jeff Anderson accused Jenky of providing incomplete lists of priests who were considered credibly accused of sexual abuse.  The Diocese denied the charges. On August 21, 2018, Jenky made these remarks regarding the grand jury report in Pennsylvania regarding sexual abuse by priests:I was truly saddened and deeply disturbed by the recent report from Pennsylvania of the sexual abuse of minors and the failures of some bishops to address of this crisis. I know that many of you share my sorrow. I stand with you. We also stand together in offering support to those who have suffered from these horrible offenses. These crimes harm the victims, weaken many people's faith, and hurt the entire Church.

Archbishop Sheen canonization 
As bishop, Jenky led the canonization cause in the Catholic church of Archbishop Fulton J. Sheen, a Peoria native. However, in 2014, citing undocumented verbal agreements, Jenky announced that he would not permit the cause to progress until Sheen's remains were transferred to Peoria from St. Patrick's Cathedral in New York City. After three years of litigation by the Diocese of Peoria against the Archdiocese of New York regarding Sheen's wishes, his remains were moved to Peoria in June 2019. Upon further objections from the Archdiocese of New York, Sheen's beatification was postponed indefinitely.

See also
 

 Catholic Church hierarchy
 Catholic Church in the United States
 Historical list of the Catholic bishops of the United States
 List of Catholic bishops of the United States
 Lists of patriarchs, archbishops, and bishops

References
Notes

External links
Office of the Bishop on the Diocese of Peoria website
Catholic-Hierarchy entry for Daniel Robert Jenky

1947 births
Living people
Clergy from Chicago
American people of Polish descent
Roman Catholic bishops of Peoria
Roman Catholic bishops of Fort Wayne–South Bend
Congregation of Holy Cross bishops
University of Notre Dame alumni
University of Notre Dame fellows
21st-century Roman Catholic bishops in the United States